The following is a list of works by George Bernard Shaw. The first section shows works in chronological sequence as written, the second tabulates these works by genre. In addition to the works listed here, Shaw produced a large quantity of journalism and criticism, particularly in his role as a music and theatre critic. These items are not included in the lists, except for the collections which Shaw himself supervised and which were published during his lifetime; these appear in the brief third section. Other collections  of Shaw's journalism and   correspondence, and editions of his plays,  have been published since his death but again are not listed here.

The main source is the chronology provided by the International  Shaw  Society. Items not covered by the chronology are separately cited. Items marked ‡ are works published anonymously by or for the Fabian Society, where Shaw's authorship was later confirmed by the Society. Except where indicated, the publication year is that of first publication.

Chronological list

Works listed by genre

Dramatic works

Political writings

Fiction

Criticism

Miscellaneous writings

Collections published in Shaw's lifetime

Notes and references

Notes

Citations

Sources

 
 
 

Shaw, George Bernard